The 2005 Rallye Deutschland was the 11th round of the 2005 World Rally Championship. It took place between 25 and 27 August 2005. Citroën's Sébastien Loeb won the race, his 18th win in the World Rally Championship.

Results

References

External links
 Results at ewrc-results.com

Rallye Deutschland, 2005
Deutschland
Rallye Deutschland